Avion Shopping Park is a shopping centre in the Ružinov borough of Bratislava, Slovakia, close to IKEA Bratislava and the Bratislava Airport. It is the biggest shopping mall in Slovakia by area.

External links 
 Official website

Shopping malls in Bratislava